Rafina is a suburban port town located on the eastern coast of Attica in Greece. It has a population of 13,091 inhabitants (2011 census). Since the 2011 local government reform it is part of the municipality Rafina-Pikermi, of which it is the seat and a municipal unit. The municipal unit has an area of 18.979 km2. It is part of Athens metropolitan area.

Geography
Rafina lies on the Aegean Sea coast, east of the Penteli mountains and northeast of the Mesogaia plain. The municipal unit of Rafina contains, besides the city itself, a large portion of the surrounding area, which is mostly woodland and farmland. The only other town is Kallitechnoupoli with a population of 923.

The town can be accessed through Greek National Road 54 (Athens – Rafina), Greek National Road 83 (Athens – Marathon – Rafina) and Greek National Road 85 (Lavrio – Rafina).

Rafina is a port town serving ferries to the southern part of Euboea as well as most of the Cyclades. Its port acts as the second port of Athens, after the Athens's port of Piraeus, but it will probably be superseded by the one in Lavrio, which is currently being expanded.

History

Prehistory

Rafina was inhabited in prehistoric times. The oldest finds are from the Neolithic Period, and a large number date from the Bronze Age (3,000 years B.C.), discovered by the excavations of Dimitrios Theocharis in '50s: a settlement on the hill above the port, bronze processing facilities near the delta of the Great Stream, and a Protohelladic Akropolis in the cape of Askitario which you can visit today.

Antiquity and later

In ancient times, Rafina was one of the 100 demes of Athens as defined by Kleisthenes. The municipality was called "Araphen", after its first ruler, Arafinas, who was one of the 100 heroes of Attica. In the municipality of Arafin, lived one of the ten breeds of Attica. Also, the area near the sea till Artemida, called "Halae Araphenides" is where Orestis and Ifigenia arrived from Tavrida according to the myth.

From later centuries, excavations discovered Roman baths and the remains of a Byzantine Church.

Modern period and settlement of Triglian refugees

After the defeat of the Greek army in the Minor Asia (1922), many refugees arrived in Greece. Some of them arrived in the area by Triglia, with ships owned by Filippos Kabounides, a Triglian shipowner, who arrived at the time of the destruction to save people and heirlooms.

A year later (August 29, 1923), Kabounides' ships brought to Rafina refugees who have lived in Tenedos for one year. After a few months, the first houses of the new refugee settlement were built and were located at the Skouze's estate that was given to the refugees. Also, around the area of the square, small shops were built and given to shop owners.

Six years later (1929), Rafina became a community.

Expansion
During the 1950s, Pantovasilissa's church was built in remembrance of the Byzantine church in Triglia which held the same name. At its forecourt was erected a statue of the metropolite of Smyrni, Chrysostomos, who was killed by the Turks during the destruction. Many years later, people in Rafina built a little church to his memory.

When Triglians arrived from Asia Minor, they brought many things from their old country, the most important being Panagia Episkepsis, a hagiography created during the 14th century A.D., which one can now see in the Byzantine Museum in Athens. A copy can be found in the city hall of Rafina.

Many heirlooms can be found in the Refugee Museum "Triglia's House", where visitors can see many originals or their copies.

World War II

During the Second World War, and during the German Occupation, German and Italian armies were installed in Rafina. Important projects for the guarding and the vallation of the area were built at the port, along the seaside and on the hill that was since named "Fort".

Rafina Today

In 1994, Rafina became a municipality and its first mayor was Andreas Kechagioglou, who kept his office until November 2011 when Rafina integrated with Pikermi as part of the Kallikratis plan. Following the planned municipal elections, Giorgios Christopoulos was elected Mayor for the new municipality of Rafina and Pikermi. During the past few years, the town has advanced significantly. Its population reaches about 12,000 people, and climbs to 30,000–50,000 during the summer. During the summer, many events take part in the town such as the "August's Moon", which takes place in August when the last full moon of August occurs. During this day, many musicians gather outside the church of St. Nikolaos and sing songs about the moon.

Rafina suffered damage from a forest fire in July 2005 and again in 2018.

Historical population

Culture

Sports
Rafina is the seat of two football clubs with presence in third national division (Gamma Ethniki), Triglia Rafina, club founded in 1932 by refugees, and Thyella Rafina, club founded in 1957.

Notable residents
Robert Pires (French footballer)
Kostas Karamanlis, former Greek prime minister
Simon Rrumbullaku Albanian-Greek football player.

International relations

Rafina is twinned with:

 Pano Lefkara, Cyprus
 Tirilye, Turkey
 Triglia, Chalkidiki

See also
List of municipalities of Attica
Panagia Pantobasilissa church, Rafina

References

External links
Official website 
triglianoi.gr
e-rafina.gr

Populated places in East Attica
Mediterranean port cities and towns in Greece
Port cities of the Aegean Sea